First Pacific Bank Limited was a bank based in Hong Kong. It was a wholly owned subsidiary of the investment holding company FPB Bank Holding Company Limited (FPB Bank Holdco). Its headquarters were in the First Pacific Bank Centre in Wan Chai.

The company's major shareholders were First Pacific Company Limited (FP Company) and MIMET FOTIC Investment Limited (MIMET FOTIC). The company was incorporated in Bermuda in 1993.

Hong Nin Savings Bank was acquired by First Pacific Group from the Government of Hong Kong in 1969.

References

External links

 First Pacific Bank (Archive – thefirstpacific.com)
 First Pacific Bank (Archive – thefirstpacific.com)

Defunct banks of Hong Kong
Bank of East Asia
Banks disestablished in 2002
Banks established in 1981